Alicia Jacobsen Menendez (born July 2, 1983) is an American television commentator, host, and writer. She is the author of The Likeability Trap: How to Break Free and Succeed as You Are (2019), and an anchor for MSNBC.  Since 2020, she has hosted American Voices on Saturdays and Sundays on MSNBC. She is also a contributing editor at Bustle  and host of its Latina to Latina podcast. Formerly, she was a correspondent on the PBS show Amanpour & Company and the host of Come Here and Say That on Fusion. Prior to that she was a host and producer at HuffPost Live. She is the daughter of United States Senator Robert Menendez.

Early life
Menendez grew up in Union City, New Jersey, the daughter of United States Senator Bob Menendez and Jane Jacobsen. Her father is a third generation American of Cuban ancestry and her mother is of German, Norwegian, and Irish ancestry. She graduated from Harvard College in 2005. She was raised Catholic.

Career
Menendez was a frequent guest on CNN, Fox News Channel, and MSNBC. Prior to joining HuffPost Live, the streaming video network of The Huffington Post, Menendez co-hosted Power Play on Sirius XM's Cristina Radio, and served as a contributor to NBCLatino.com. In 2011, Menendez and Adriana Maestas founded Dailygrito.com, a website that offers a Latino take on politics and media. In 2012, DailyGrito.com was acquired by Politic365.com.

Menendez co-founded Define American with Jose Antonio Vargas, Jake Brewer, and Jehmu Greene. Define American focuses on immigration reform. She served as Senior Advisor at NDN, a center-left think tank and advocacy organization in Washington, DC. Menendez is a veteran of Rock the Vote and Democracia USA. She also spent time as a television segment producer and on-air contributor for RNN TV in New York. Menendez is a former correspondent for the show Amanpour & Company on PBS. She joined MSNBC in October 2019. On September 19, 2020, she began hosting a new program on MSNBC, American Voices, which airs on Saturdays and Sundays. In 2022, she was regularly seen on MSNBC serving as guest anchor of other programs such as All In, Alex Wagner Tonight and the 11th Hour.

At Harvard University, Menendez's senior honors thesis on women's social capital drew the attention of U.S. News & World Report and The New York Times. In 2005, The Harvard Crimson named Menendez one of the 15 most interesting members of the class of 2005 and she was selected to deliver her undergraduate commencement address.

Personal life
As of 2012 Menendez resides in Miami.

In 2015, she married Carlos Prío Odio in Coral Gables, Florida. Prío's grandfather, Carlos Prío Socarrás, was the president of Cuba from 1948 to 1952.

Bibliography 
The Likeability Trap: How to Break Free and Succeed as You Are (HarperCollins, 2019)
"Why We Should Let Go of Old Rules and Reimagine Leadership" (Thrive Global, November 5, 2019)

References

External links 
Official website

Interview on The Daily Show (11/20/2019).

1983 births
Living people
American non-fiction writers
Harvard College alumni
MSNBC people
People from Union City, New Jersey
Writers from New Jersey
American people of Irish descent
American people of German descent
American people of Norwegian descent
American writers of Cuban descent
Hispanic and Latino American people in television
American women non-fiction writers
Catholics from New Jersey